Norwood News is a bi-weekly newspaper that primarily serves the Northwest Bronx neighborhoods of Norwood, Bedford Park, Fordham and University Heights. It was founded in October 1988 by the Mosholu Preservation Corporation, a not-for-profit affiliate of Montefiore Medical Center. It has won a number of awards, including the New York Press Club award for community coverage. Its current editor-in-chief, Síle Moloney, has been with the newspaper since 2019.

History 
The paper, which began as a monthly in 1988, was created by Dart Westphal, president of Mosholu Preservation Corporation, with the help of founding editor Betty Chen, after "sensing that [Norwood] needed a communication vehicle, a way for people and organizations to talk to each other and build on their community improvement efforts."

In 1994, the paper published the article "Did Former Buildings Commish Sink P.S. 20?", which established it as a paper that could produce hard-hitting news. This was also the year the paper switched to its current bi-weekly format.

In 1998, the newspaper moved to the Keeper's House at Williamsbridge Reservoir after the Mosholu Preservation Corporation purchased the house from Dr. Issac H. Barkey to establish it as the newspaper's headquarters.

In 2006, the article "Battle Against Pinnacle Group Resembles '78 Riverdale Row" revealed shady tactics used by the Pinnacle Group, a housing corporation, to evict residents who could not afford to pay rent.

In 2013, legislation was passed by Councilman Fernando Cabrera that allowed New Yorkers to view crime maps after the Norwood News spent years investigating the lack of transparency from the New York City Police Department.

In 2015, the paper published the award-winning article "Tenants Turn Heat Up On Landlord", which revealed a spike in heat complaints after multiple buildings were purchased by The Related Companies, a multi-billion dollar development firm.

The paper currently has a circulation of 15,000.

Legacy 
In 2003, Bronx Borough President Adolfo Carrión Jr. proclaimed October 29 as Norwood News Day in the Bronx.

List of editors-in-chief 
 Betty Chen (October 1988 – January 1993)
 Helen Schaub (February 1993 – September 1994)
 Jordan Moss (October 1994 – August 2011)
 Alex Kratz (September 2011 – November 2013)
 David Cruz (December 2013 – March 2020)
 Síle Moloney (March 2020 – present)

List of awards 
 2002 Best Investigative or In-Depth News Story Award, Jordan Moss and William Wichert, Independent Press Association
 "Boy's Death in Fire Follows Landlord Neglect" by Jordan Moss, 2003 Best Series Award, Independent Press Association
 "City Homeless Program Rewards Bad Landlords" by Heather Haddon, 2003 Best News Story Award, Independent Press Association
 "A Guide to Navigating the Middle School Maze" by Heather Haddon, 2003 Best Public Affairs Article Award, Independent Press Association
 "A Stinking Scandal", 2003 Best Editorial/Commentary Award, Independent Press Association
 "School Strengthens Bangladeshi Language and Culture" by Heather Haddon, 2003 Best Feature Award, Independent Press Association
 2004 Best Article on the Arts Award, Heather Haddon, Independent Press Association
 2004 Best Investigative News Story, Jordan Moss and Heather Haddon, Independent Press Association
 2004 Best Editorial/Commentary Award, Jordan Moss, 2nd place, Independent Press Association
 2004 Best Public Affairs Article, Heather Haddon, 2nd place, Independent Press Association
 2005 Best Investigative or In-Depth News Story Award, Jordan Moss and Heather Haddon, Independent Press Association
 2006 In-Depth Reporting, Heather Haddon, 1st place, New York Press Association
 2014 Coverage of Business, Financial & Economic News, David Cruz, 3rd place, New York Press Association
 "With Oval Park in the Dark, Nighttime Football Practice A Blur" by David Cruz, 2015 Best Sports Feature Award, 1st place, New York Press Association
 2015 Headline Writing Award, David Cruz, 3rd place, New York Press Association
 2015 Photographer of the Year Award, Adi Talwar, 3rd place, New York Press Association
 2015 Best Photograph Award, Adi Talwar, 3rd place, Independent Press Association
 2015 Best Small Circulation Publication Award, Norwood News, Independent Press Association
 "Tenants Turn Up Heat Up On Landlord" by David Cruz, 2016 Best Investigative/In-Depth Story Award, 1st place, Independent Press Association
 2016 Best Photograph Award, Adi Talwar, Independent Press Association
 "Noise in Norwood and Beyond" by David Cruz, 2017 Best Investigative/In-Depth Story Award, 2nd place, Independent Press Association
 2017 Community Coverage Award, Norwood News, New York Press Club

See also 
 Local news
 Bronx Times-Reporter
 Mott Haven Herald
 Riverdale Press
 News 12 The Bronx / News 12 Brooklyn
 Keeper's House at Williamsbridge Reservoir

References

External links 
 
 Mosholu Preservation Corporation

Publications established in 1988
Newspapers published in the Bronx
1988 establishments in New York City
Free newspapers
Biweekly newspapers published in the United States